Brigadier John Gilbert McKinna  (11 December 1906 – 28 January 2000) was a senior officer in the Australian Army during the Second World War. He was also the Police Commissioner for South Australia between July 1957 and June 1972.

References
Service details – Australian War Memorial
Police Journal SA
SA Police History

1906 births
2000 deaths
Military personnel from South Australia
Australian brigadiers
Australian Commanders of the Order of the British Empire
Australian Companions of the Distinguished Service Order
Australian Companions of the Order of St Michael and St George
Australian Lieutenants of the Royal Victorian Order
Australian Army personnel of World War II
Commissioners of the South Australia Police
People educated at Prince Alfred College
Public servants of South Australia
People from Adelaide